Creepy (Japanese: , Kurīpī: Itsuwari no Rinjin, "Creepy: The False Neighbor") is a 2016 Japanese thriller film directed by Kiyoshi Kurosawa, starring Hidetoshi Nishijima, Yūko Takeuchi, Teruyuki Kagawa, Haruna Kawaguchi, and Masahiro Higashide. Based on the 2012 novel by Yutaka Maekawa, it is about a married couple uncovering the secrets of their new, mysterious neighbor. The film had its world premiere at the 66th Berlin International Film Festival on 13 February 2016. It was released in Japan on 18 June 2016.

Plot
Having resigned as a police profiler following an injury sustained in a failed negotiation with a serial killer, Koichi Takakura and his wife Yasuko move to a house closer to his new job as a university lecturer in criminal psychology. In an effort to be friendly, Yasuko introduces herself to their two closest neighbors. One, Mrs. Tanaka, coldly rejects any kind of friendship with the Takakuras. Yasuko rings the doorbell at the house of the neighbor between the Takakuras and Tanakas, but there is no answer. When Yasuko goes again to leave a bag of chocolates at the neighbor's gate, he appears and gives his name as Masayuki Nishino. Their initial encounter gives Yasuko a creepy impression of Nishino, as he acts strangely whenever he's around her.
 
While at work, Koichi becomes interested in a cold case involving the disappearance of three members of a family leaving only the youngest daughter, Saki Honda, behind. Saki's testimony was so erratic that she was disregarded as an unreliable witness. A former police colleague of Koichi's, Nogami, asks him to help investigate the case. While visiting the crime scene, Koichi and Nogami come across Saki there and try to talk to her, but she refuses, saying she doesn't remember the events leading up to her family's disappearance. Back at home, Yasuko encounters Nishino again when her dog Max runs up to him, and he tells her he lives with his daughter, Mio, and his wife; however, when Yasuko says she looks forward to meeting his wife, Nishino rudely dismisses her. When walking home, Koichi is confronted by Nishino, who says that Yasuko has become a nuisance and is threatening the stability of the neighborhood's relationships. Both Koichi and Yasuko grow uneasy about Nishino, but they relent when he becomes friendlier and more open.

At the university, Koichi and Nogami interview Saki, who says that before her family vanished, they started acted in  increasingly bizarre ways, with her parents having strange conversations with the same person. She also remembers seeing a man stare at them from the home of the Hondas' neighbors, the Mizutas. Nogami investigates the Mizuta house and discovers five decomposing bodies vacuum-sealed in plastic bags. Yasuko, when looking for Max, finds him in a park with Nishino, who then tries to come onto her. Koichi is approached outside their house by Mio, who says that Nishino is not her father, but a complete stranger. He tries to ask her questions, but Nishino returns home with Yasuko before Mio can say anything.

Yasuko begins to act erratically, seeming ill and having emotional outbursts. Because of this behavior, Koichi becomes more suspicious of Nishino, and asks Nogami to look into him. When he and Tanaka meet on the street outside, she is dismissive when he asks her questions, but warns him that Nishino is a monster and barely human. Nogami discovers that photos of Masayuki Nishino in government records show a completely different man. He goes to the Nishino house to investigate, and Nishino invites Nogami inside, but then disappears. Searching for him, Nogami finds a corridor with a heavy metal door at the end and opens it. 

Koichi arrives home just as an explosion in the Tanaka house starts a fire. While he rushes to their aid, he notices Nishino casually watching television at home. Police lieutenant Tanimoto comes from the scene of the fire to tell Koichi that three bodies were recovered from the house; two are those of Tanaka and her bedridden mother, but the third is Nogami. Koichi visits Saki and attempts to show her a photograph of Nishino, asking if the man in the photo is the one she knew as Mr. Mizuta, but she says she doesn't remember him.

Nishino is revealed to an impostor who, after apparently killing Mio's real father, is now manipulating her into disposing of corpses in vacuum-sealed bags like those at the Mizuta house, beginning with her father and older brother, and holding Mio's mother prisoner by making Mio inject her with tranquilizing drugs. Mio's mother attacks Nishino after Mio purposely gives her a lower dose than normal, but he subdues her and then tries to have Mio execute her. When she falters, he shoots her mother with Nogami's gun in front of her. 

When Mio says she can't dispose of her mother's body alone, Nishino brings Yasuko, whom he has been injecting with drugs for some time, down into the chamber, shows her Mio's mother's body, and forces her to help Mio dispose of it. Koichi returns from trying to gain access to Nogami's files and is startled when Mio barges into his house. He asks her where Yasuko is, but is interrupted by Nishino, who comes looking for Mio. Koichi locks the door and tells Mio to call the police, but Nishino unlocks the door with Yasuko's house key. Koichi assaults Nishino, but police arrive immediately and detain Koichi.

Tanimoto talks to Koichi and has Nishino brought to the police station. When they discover Nishino has been allowed to leave, they both drive to Nishino's house. Tanimoto discovers the chamber, but is drugged and incapacitated by Nishino. Koichi goes into the chamber and finds Yasuko and Tanimoto, but is confronted by Nishino holding Yasuko at gunpoint. Nishino reveals to Koichi that he has effectively brainwashed Yasuko and Mio through drugs, and assures Koichi that Yasuko is doing what she wants, illustrating by giving Yasuko the gun, which she returns to him. Koichi realizes that Nishino moves from family to family, brainwashes them, and eventually makes them kill each other. He manages to persuade Yasuko to come back to him and seems to have the upper hand, but as Koichi confronts Nishino, he is suddenly injected by Yasuko and collapses.

When Mio comes home the next day, Nishino tells her they will be moving, and that their "family" has grown. He leaves with Mio, Yasuko, the drugged Koichi, and Max for an abandoned building, from which Nishino begins to scout for another "home," planning to pretend they are a family down on their luck until they can kill or drug the residents and take over their house. Deeming Max unnecessary baggage, Nishino brings Koichi from the car, gives him the gun, and instructs him on how to kill Max. Though seemingly passive, Koichi turns, tells Nishino "this is where you fall," and shoots him. Mio celebrates with Max, and Yasuko, understanding what she and Koichi went through, breaks down in his arms.

Cast
 Hidetoshi Nishijima as Koichi Takakura
 Yūko Takeuchi as Yasuko Takakura
 Teruyuki Kagawa as Nishino
 Haruna Kawaguchi as Saki Honda
 Masahiro Higashide as Nogami
 Ryōko Fujino as Mio
 Toru Baba as Matsuoka
 Takashi Sasano as Tanimoto
 Masahiro Toda as Okawa

Production
The filming began on 1 August 2015, and ended on 4 September 2015.

Release
The film had its world premiere at the 66th Berlin International Film Festival on 13 February 2016. It was released in Japan on 18 June 2016.

Reception
On review aggregator website Rotten Tomatoes, the film holds an approval rating of 91%, based on 47 reviews, and an average rating of 7.16/10. The website's critical consensus reads, "Creepy lives up to its title with a suspenseful and thoroughly unsettling - not to mention well-acted - blend of crime procedural and domestic drama." On Metacritic, the film has received a weighted average score of 76 out of 100, based on 13 critics, indicating "generally favorable reviews".

Deborah Young of The Hollywood Reporter wrote that with Creepy, "Kiyoshi Kurosawa returns from auteurist chores to the classic horror that made him a cult name." The New York Times critic Manohla Dargis praised the film, writing, "Creepy certainly works — looks and feels — like a horror movie, but it also has the conundrums of a detective story, the emotional currents of a domestic drama and the quickening pulse of a psychological thriller, a combination that creates a kind of destabilization." Rob Staeger of The Village Voice also praised the film and singled out Teruyuki Kagawa's performance, writing: "The performances are compelling all around, but Kagawa stands out: His Nishino, somehow as cowardly as he is sinister, recalls the oily nervousness of Peter Lorre." Chuck Bowen of Slant Magazine gave the film 3 out of 4 stars, commenting that "Creepy is a masterful work of suspense, but it ultimately remains an exercise; the film doesn't quite make the leap into the gloriously irrational realm of the empathetic and transcendent."

References

External links
 

2016 films
2010s thriller films
Japanese thriller films
Shochiku films
Films directed by Kiyoshi Kurosawa
Films based on mystery novels
Films based on Japanese novels
2010s Japanese films
2010s Japanese-language films